There are an abundance of paper, on-line and broadcast media in Italy that cover all genres of music.

Print media and/or on-line magazines

Many Italian magazines about music now maintain a presence on the Internet with on-line versions of their Italian music.

Broadcast media

Nationwide, the state-run broadcasting network, RAI (Radio audizioni italiane), provides three TV channels and three AM or FM  radio channels. There are also three private TV networks, run by the Mediaset company. All provide live or recorded music many hours per week. Many large cities in Italy have local TV stations, as well, which may provide live folk or dialect music often of interest only to the immediate area. Additionally, there are many hundreds of private FM radio stations broadcasting in Italy, with much of the programming devoted to music.

See also
 Media of Italy

Italian music
Mass media in Italy